is a Japanese football player.

Playing career
Shikayama was born in Nagasaki Prefecture on May 26, 1996. He joined J1 League club V-Varen Nagasaki in 2018.

References

External links

1996 births
Living people
Tokai Gakuen University alumni
Association football people from Nagasaki Prefecture
Japanese footballers
J1 League players
J2 League players
V-Varen Nagasaki players
Association football defenders